Joshua Berger is the Art Director and a founder of Plazm magazine. As a visual artist, he was a finalist for the Contemporary Northwest Art Awards at the Portland Art Museum, according to The Oregonian newspaper.

References

Living people
American art directors
Year of birth missing (living people)
Place of birth missing (living people)